Dolores Margaret Richard Spikes (August 24, 1936 – June 1, 2015) was an American mathematician and university administrator.  Born in Baton Rouge, Dolores Richard attended public and parochial schools in that city and, still in her home city, went on to Southern University from which she earned her B.S. degree in mathematics in 1957. Also at Southern she met her future husband, Hermon Spikes

Spikes continued her education at the University of Illinois in Champaign-Urbana where she earned a master of science degree in mathematics and then returned in 1958 to Louisiana where she married Spikes and began teaching high school science in Mossville, a small, mostly black community near Lake Charles.

In December, 1971 (with a dissertation entitled "Semi-Valuations and Groups of Divisibility")  Dolores Spikes earned a Ph.D. in mathematics from Louisiana State University.  The website "Black Women in Mathematics" affirms that Spikes was the first African-American woman to earn a Ph.D. from Louisiana State; that website also offers a number of anecdotes that help to portray Spikes as a human being as well as an academic.

In the 1980s at Southern University Spikes moved into various administrative positions—starting in 1982 as Assistant to the Chancellor and, in the late eighties, she served as Chancellor for both the Baton Rouge and New Orleans Campuses of Southern University—in fact, she was the first female chancellor of a Louisiana Land Grant University.  In 1987 she was appointed to the board of Harvard University's Institute of Educational Management.   In 1988 Dr. Spikes accepted the position of president of the Southern University and A&M College System.-- she not only was the first woman to lead a public college or university in Louisiana, she also was the first woman in the US to serve as chief administrator for a university system. Later, Spikes became the 11th president of the University of Maryland Eastern Shore—and its first female president—from 1996–2001.

References

1936 births
2015 deaths
American women mathematicians
20th-century American mathematicians
21st-century American mathematicians
African-American mathematicians
Southern University alumni
Louisiana State University alumni
University of Maryland Eastern Shore faculty
People from Baton Rouge, Louisiana
University of Illinois Urbana-Champaign alumni
Southern University faculty
20th-century American women scientists
20th-century women mathematicians
21st-century women mathematicians
21st-century American women
20th-century African-American women
20th-century African-American people
21st-century African-American women
21st-century African-American people